Town Theatre is a historic community theatre located at Columbia, South Carolina. It was built in 1924, and is a rectangular brick building with a two-story glazed central arch with Art Deco influences.  A brick annex was added to the rear of the building in the 1950s.  It houses one of the first community theatres in the United States.

It was added to the National Register of Historic Places in 1974.

References

Theatres on the National Register of Historic Places in South Carolina
Art Deco architecture in South Carolina
Buildings and structures in Columbia, South Carolina
National Register of Historic Places in Columbia, South Carolina
Theatres completed in 1924